Tubeufia is a genus in the Tubeufiaceae family of fungi.

The genus was circumscribed by Albert Julius Otto Penzig and Pier Andrea Saccardo in Malpighia vol.11 on page 517 in 1898.

The genus name of Tubeufia is in honour of Carl or Karl von Tubeuf, FLS HFRSE (1862–1941), who was a German forestry scientist, mycologist and plant pathologist.

Species
As accepted by Species Fungorum;

 Tubeufia abundata 
 Tubeufia acaciae 
 Tubeufia aciculospora 
 Tubeufia aquatica 
 Tubeufia asclepiadis 
 Tubeufia asiana 
 Tubeufia bambusicola 
 Tubeufia brevis 
 Tubeufia brevispina 
 Tubeufia brunnea 
 Tubeufia cerea 
 Tubeufia chiangmaiensis 
 Tubeufia chlamydospora 
 Tubeufia claspisphaeria 
 Tubeufia cylindrothecia 
 Tubeufia dactylariae 
 Tubeufia dentophora 
 Tubeufia dictyospora 
 Tubeufia eccentrica 
 Tubeufia entadae 
 Tubeufia eugeniae 
 Tubeufia fangchengensis 
 Tubeufia filiformis 
 Tubeufia freycinetiae 
 Tubeufia garugae 
 Tubeufia guangxiensis 
 Tubeufia hechiensis 
 Tubeufia helicoma 
 Tubeufia helicomyces 
 Tubeufia hyalospora 
 Tubeufia inaequalis 
 Tubeufia javanica 
 Tubeufia krabiensis 
 Tubeufia latispora 
 Tubeufia laxispora 
 Tubeufia lilliputea 
 Tubeufia longihelicospora 
 Tubeufia longiseta 
 Tubeufia machaerinae 
 Tubeufia mackenziei 
 Tubeufia minuta 
 Tubeufia pachythrix 
 Tubeufia palmarum 
 Tubeufia pandanicola 
 Tubeufia parvispora 
 Tubeufia parvula 
 Tubeufia roseohelicospora 
 Tubeufia rubra 
 Tubeufia sahyadriensis 
 Tubeufia sessilis 
 Tubeufia silentvalleyensis 
 Tubeufia sympodihylospora 
 Tubeufia sympodilaxispora 
 Tubeufia sympodiophora 
 Tubeufia tectonae 
 Tubeufia tratensis 
 Tubeufia xylophila 

Former species; (Assume Tubeufiaceae family if not mentioned)

 T. albo-ostiolata  = Thaxteriella albo-ostiolata 
 T. alpina  = Acanthostigmina longispora
 T. amazonensis  = Thaxteriella amazonensis
 T. anceps  = Parahelicomyces paludosus
 T. aurantiella  = Neohelicosporium aurantiellum
 T. clintonii  = Acanthostigma perpusillum
 T. coccicola  = Podonectria coccicola, Podonectriaceae
 T. coronata  = Parahelicomyces paludosus
 T. corynespora  = Thaxteriella corynespora
 T. eriodermatis  = Lichenotubeufia eriodermatis
 T. genuflexa  = Acanthostigmella genuflexa
 T. hebridensis  = Taphrophila hebridensis
 T. heterodermiae  = Lichenotubeufia heterodermiae
 T. indica  = Thaxteriella indica
 T. khunkornensis  = Helicoma khunkornense
 T. miscanthi  = Helicoma miscanthi
 T. nigrotuberculata  = Herpotrichia nigrotuberculata, Melanommataceae
 T. ovata  = Thaxteriella ovata
 T. paludosa  = Parahelicomyces paludosus
 T. pannariae  = Lichenotubeufia pannariae
 T. pezizula  = Thaxteriella pezizula
 T. roraimensis  = Thaxteriella roraimensis
 T. scopula  = Acanthohelicospora scopula
 T. setosa  = Acanthostigmina minuta
 T. stromaticola  = Puttemansia stromaticola
 T. trichella  = Taphrophila trichella
 T. trichospora  = Ophionectria trichospora, Nectriaceae
 T. vermicularispora  = Chaetosphaerulina vermicularispora
 T. yasudae  = Chaetosphaerulina yasudae

References

External links
Tubeufia at Index Fungorum

Tubeufiaceae